Asteronotus spongicolus is a species of sea slug or dorid nudibranch, a marine gastropod mollusk in the family Discodorididae.

Distribution
This species was described from Zanzibar, Tanzania with additional material from the mainland coast of Tanzania and also from Lizard Island, North Queensland, Australia. It is also known from Malaysia and the Philippines.

Description

Ecology
Asteronotus spongicolus feeds on the leafy sponge Carteriospongia sp. and is well camouflaged on the undersides of the sponge blades.

References

Discodorididae
Gastropods described in 2002